The Judicate of Arborea or the Kingdom of Arborea was one of the four independent judicates into which the island of Sardinia was divided in the Middle Ages. It occupied the central-west portion of the island, wedged between Logudoro to the north and east, Cagliari to the south and east, and the Mediterranean Sea to the west. To the north east and beyond Logudoro was located Gallura, with which Arborea had far less interaction. Arborea outlasted her neighbours, surviving well into the 15th century. The earliest known judicial seat was Tharros. The Judicate of Arborea at the times of its maximum expansion occupied the whole island's territory, except the cities of Alghero and Cagliari.

Origins
In the early 9th century, when the Arabs and Berbers of North Africa became aggressive in expansion and piracy, the central authorities of the Byzantine Empire were unable to effectively defend or consistently govern the imperial province of Sardinia.    The local Byzantine magistrates, entitled iudici, meaning "judges" were increasingly left to provide for administration and defense by themselves. Maintaining the traditional forms and patterns of the imperial bureaucracy, the island's iudicati, originally an administrative sub-division, had become autonomous states provinces ruled by iudices. By the 10th century, these districts (like the provinces administered by dux ("Duke") and comes ("Count") on mainland Europe) had become hereditary or rotated amongst a few most powerful clans.

The first important Giudice of Arborea was Marianus I (ruled 1060 – 1070) of the Thori family. In 1070, his successor, Orzocorre I moved the capital from the ancient port of Tharros, which was exposed to Arab attacks, to Oristano. At about that time, Sardinia begins to emerge from obscurity and come into the historian's view. Under the ambitious Pope Gregory VII, then leading a papal reform, Sardinia was integrated into the wider Christendom. By the infusion of Western monasticism and Pisan ecclesiastic rule, she became involved in the conflicts and commerce of Europe.

Lacon-Gunale dynasty
Under Constantine I of the Lacon dynasty, Arborea paid tribute to the papacy and sponsored Camaldolese monks, in opposition to the monks of Marseille favoured by rival Cagliari. Constantine did homage to Pisa for his kingdom and  his successor was his brother Comita II. When Pope Innocent II divided Sardinia between the sees of Pisa and Genoa in 1133, Arborea fell to the former, but Comita, for reasons of furthering Arborean independence, allied with Genoa during the subsequent civil wars of that decade. In 1145, Comita was excommunicated by Baldwin, Archbishop of Pisa, and the kingdom of Arborea was nominally transferred to Logudoro.

Comita's son and successor, Barison II, put Arborea back on good terms with Pisa. He married into the Catalan nobility, creating ties to Spain which culminated in Sardinia falling to the Crown of Aragon some centuries later. In 1164, Barison paid the Holy Roman Emperor Frederick Barbarossa to have him crowned King of Sardinia, but the emperor revoked that title the next year, though Barison continued to employ it. He finally left Pisa for Genoa, but his legacy was civil war. His son Peter I and grandson Hugh I finally divided the kingdom by the Treaty of Oristano (1192), but in the end Hugh's line, the House of Cervera (or Bas), succeeded in establishing themselves.

De Serra-Bas dynasty
While Peter II, son of Hugh, has been accused by historians of impoverishing his realm of glory, his son Marianus II expanded it substantially, even ruling over a majority of the island. During the final decades of the 13th century, three other giudicati fell into the hands of either Pisa or Genoa or one of their great families, but Arborea remained independent.

Hugh II (ruled 1321 – 1336), great-grandson of Marianus II, headed up a faction which favoured James II of Aragon, who had been promised the island by the pope, as overlord. He supported the Infante Alfonso in his campaign (1323 – 1324) to conquer the island from Pisa. In 1336, Hugh II was succeeded by his son Peter III (died 1345). His brother Marianus IV (ruled 1353 – 1375) was the only Sardinian ruler to be known as "the Great." He was educated at the Aragonese court (that is in the Crown of Aragon's royal court), but later turned against his cultural allies and led a victorious revolt against the Catalan invaders (Sardinian-Catalan War). With Marianus IV the great, a period of splendour commenced in the Kingdom of Arborea. Oral traditions were codified and new legislation enacted. Army and tactics were reformed. With the exception of Cagliari, Alghero, and Sassari (then under Brancaleone Doria), Marianus conquered the whole of the island, making Arborea the strongest any kingdom had ever been.

Marianus was succeeded by his son Hugh III, who furthered his father's legislation and died without descendants in 1383. A republic was proclaimed, but the crown was claimed by Eleanor, elder sister of Hugh III, who was married to Brancaleone Doria. She succeeded in power in 1387. Eleanor was technically regent on behalf of her sons Frederick and, subsequently, Marianus V. Eleanor died in 1404 and Marianus in 1407: after the latter's death the succession descended to William III of Narbonne, grandson of Beatrice, Eleanor's sister. He defended the island against the Catalan troops of king Martin of Aragon, but Martin I of Sicily (son of Martin of Aragon) vanquished them in the Battle of Sanluri on 30 June 1409. Martin's sudden death made possible a recovery and occupation of Sassari and part of Logoduro, as well as reclamation of the title of Judge of Arborea by William. However, all the Arborean castles fell after a renewed Catalan offensive and Oristano fell in March 1410 without resistance.

Leonard Cubell laid claim to the title of Judge of Arborea, but was compelled in Oristano by Pedro de Torrelles to renounce the title, after which he was given the Marquisate of Oristano and County of Goceano. In 1420, Alfonso V of Aragon purchased for 100,000 gold florins the rights of the viscounts of Narbonne. Later, the Aragonese governor, Leonardo Alagon, rebelled and was also able to beat the king's troops at Uras in 1470. However, his defeat at the Battle of Macomer (1478) put a definitive end to the independence of Arborea and Sardinia.

Curatoriae

Arborea was divided into thirteen (at times, fourteen)  or partes (sing.  and ). The  were an inheritance of Byzantine government and are still recognised today as "historic regions."

The fourteen  of Arborea were

Barbagia di Belvì
Barbagia d’Ollolai
Barigadu 
Bonorzuli
Campidano di Cabras
Campidano di Milis
Campidano di Simaxis
Guilcier
Mandrolisai
Marmilla
Montis, 
Usellus
Valenza
Brabaxiana

See also
List of kings or judges of Arborea

Sources
Dizionario Biografico degli Italiani. Rome, 1963 – present.
Nowé, Laura Sannia. Dai "lumi" dalla patria Italiana: Cultura letteraria sarda. Mucchi Editore: Modena, 1996.
Day, John. La Sardegna sotto la dominazione pisano-genovese dal secolo XI al secolo XIV. UTET: Turin, 1987.

Notes 

Arborea
History of Sardinia
Medieval Italy
Italian states
Christian states
2nd millennium in Italy
Former monarchies of Europe